Dean Mitchell (born 1957) is an American figurative artist who works primarily in watercolor and oil paint. His subjects, derived largely from African American culture, have been cited for their emotional depth, avoidance of facile sentimentality, and accomplished sense of formal design.

Mitchell was born in Pittsburgh, Pennsylvania in 1957, and raised in Quincy, Florida. After graduating from the Columbus College of Art and Design in 1980, Mitchell moved to Kansas City, Missouri and started working as an illustrator at Hallmark Cards. He remained at Hallmark for the next three years and began entering national and international art competitions. When Hallmark terminated his employment in 1983, he decided to pursue painting as a full-time career.

Mitchell's artwork has been the subject of numerous articles, and is represented in museum and corporate collections, including the Kemper Museum of Contemporary Art, the Nelson-Atkins Museum of Art, and the Saint Louis Art Museum. His life is the subject of an illustrated book for children, Against All Odds: Artist Dean Mitchell's Story.

Mitchell has also illustrated US postage stamps, such as the 1995 Louis Armstrong stamp in the Jazz Musician series.

Exhibitions

References

External links
Biography, Dean L. Mitchell
A Black World Of Ins and Outs, Michael Kimmelman. The New York Times, April 26, 2002
Former KC artist Dean Mitchell finds a warmer welcome in Florida, Kansas City.com
Dean Mitchell's soul-satisfying art exhibit now at Leepa-Rattner Museum of Art, Tampa Bay.com
Delray Beach exhibit shows works of watercolorist Dean Mitchell, Sun Sentinel.com
Everything's a Portrait: Watercolors of Dean Mitchell, Broward Palm Beach New Times
Florida artist puts emotion on canvas, Tampa Tribune
Biography, Florida Black History Month, 2010
Biography, Charlotte Street Foundation
Biography, Autry National Center
Dean Mitchell Artist Biography
Against All Odds: Artist Dean Mitchell's Story
The Art of Dean Mitchell
Dean Mitchell on the African American Visual Artists Database
Dean Mitchell at the Canton Museum of Art (2010 profile produced by Western Reserve Public Media) 
Dean Mitchell's American West (Video overview produced by Gadsden Arts Center and Museum)

1957 births
Living people
Artists from Pittsburgh
21st-century American painters
20th-century American painters
American watercolorists
American male painters
Columbus College of Art and Design alumni
People from Quincy, Florida
American stamp designers
20th-century African-American painters
21st-century African-American artists
20th-century American male artists